Khvor-e Shahabi (also Romanized as Khvor-e Shahābī and Khūr Shahābī; also known as  Khor Chakābī, Khor Shahab, Khur-e Shahāb, Khūr Shahā’ī, and Khvor-e Shahāb) is a village in Bu ol Kheyr Rural District, Delvar District, Tangestan County, Bushehr Province, Iran. At the 2006 census, its population was 1,130, in 265 families.

References 

Populated places in Tangestan County